Hispo is a genus of the spider family Salticidae (jumping spiders).

Species of Hispo range in body length from 5 to 7 mm in females, and 3 to 4 in males.

Distribution
Most species are found in Madagascar, with others found in Africa and the Seychelles. These parts were mostly connected during the time of Gondwana, or lie close.

Species
, the World Spider Catalog accepted the following species:
 Hispo alboclypea Wanless, 1981 – Seychelles
 Hispo cingulata Simon, 1885 – Madagascar
 Hispo frenata (Simon, 1900) – Madagascar
 Hispo georgius (Peckham & Peckham, 1892) – Central, East and Southern Africa, Madagascar
 Hispo macfarlanei Wanless, 1981 – Madagascar
 Hispo pullata Wanless, 1981 – Madagascar
 Hispo striolata Simon, 1898 – Seychelles
 Hispo sulcata Wanless, 1981 – Madagascar
 Hispo tenuis Wanless, 1981 – Madagascar

References

Salticidae
Spiders of Africa
Salticidae genera